Jaime Edmundo Rodríguez Ordóñez (born Guayaquil, Ecuador, 12 April 1940), historian of Latin America, particularly the independence-era in Mexico.  His is now professor emeritus at the University of California, Irvine.

Biography
Jaime Edmundo Rodríguez Ordóñez was born in Guayaquil, Ecuador during his father's military service. Rodríguez Ordóñez is the son of Colonel Luis Rodríguez Sandoval, who had been Chief of the frontier zone during the war between Ecuador and Peru.  His mother was María Beatriz Ordóñez Córdova.  At age 8, he moved to the United States together with his mother, where he has resided permanently.  He is married to Linda Alexander Rodríguez.

Education
In 1965 he earned his B.A. in economics at the University of Houston and following year, he earned his M.A. in history also at University of Houston. In 1970, he completed his doctorate at University of Texas, Austin, under the direction of Nettie Lee Benson, with his dissertation on Vicente Rocafuerte and the rise of Latin American identity.

Academic career
He began teaching at California State University, Long Beach, remaining there 1969–1973.  In 1974, he began his career at University of California, Irvine, where he taught until his retirement.  Between 1980 and 1986, he was Graduate Dean and Vice Chancellor for Research.  He was the founding editor of the peer-reviewed journal, Mexican Studies/Estudios Mexicanos, a bilingual, binational journal published jointly with the University of California and the National University of Mexico.

In his published work, Rodríguez Ordóñez contends that Latin America was not isolated from events in the rest of the western world, so that it was actively involved in the events of the Atlantic Revolutions. Although the American Revolution and the French Revolution were known throughout the confines of the Spanish monarchy, he argues that they did not directly influence the Spanish territories in the Americas. Rather, Rodríguez suggests that the imprisonment of Ferdinand VII during the Napoleonic invasion of Spain and the subsequent institutional vacuum that this created were the direct causes of the collapse of the Spanish monarchy. It is in this context that countless Juntas succeed each other both on the Iberian peninsula and in Spanish America that sought to represent a government free from French influence, but faithful to the Spanish monarch and monarchy as an institution.
The distrust of many Americans of peninsular-born Spaniards and that of many peninsulares in the Americans led to civil wars in which in many cases entire families were divided between insurgents and royalists.  Rodríguez Ordóñez has emphasized the importance of the influence of the 1812 Constitution of Cádiz on Spanish America, especially in New Spain and the Kingdom of Quito. He contends this constitution was much more representative and inclusive than many of its contemporaries, including ones from Latin America, which were much more traditional. He stresses the role of elections as a starting point for modern representative governance in Latin America and as one of the reasons why the wars for independence lasted at least a decade.

Select publications
Monographs
The Emergence of Spanish America: Vicente Rocafuerte and Spanish Americanism: 1808–1832. University of California Press, 1975.
Revolución, independencia y las nuevas naciones de América. Vol. 9. Fundación MAPFRE Tavera, 2005.
" We are Now the True Spaniards": Sovereignty, Revolution, Independence, and the Emergence of the Federal Republic of Mexico, 1808–1824. Stanford University Press, 2012.
La independencia de la América española. Fondo de Cultura Económica, 2016.
Edited and co-authored works
Editor, The Divine Charter: Constitutionalism and Liberalism in Nineteenth-Century Mexico. Rowman & Littlefield, 2007.
Co-author with Jaime E. Rodr Guez. The Independence of Spanish America. Vol. 84. Cambridge University Press, 1998.
Editor. The origins of Mexican national politics, 1808–1847. Rowman & Littlefield, 1997.
Co-author with MacLachlan." The Forging of the Cosmic Race: A Reinterpretation of Colonial Mexico 223 (1980).
Articles
"The Process of Spanish American Independence." A Companion to Latin American History (2010): 195–214.
"New Spain and the 1808 Crisis of the Spanish Monarchy." Mexican Studies/Estudios Mexicanos 24.2 (2008): 245–287.
"La naturaleza de la representación en Nueva España y México." Secuencia 61 (2005): 6-32.
"The Struggle for Dominance: the Legislature versus the Executive in Early Mexico." Christon I. Archer (comp.), The Birth of Modern México, Scholarly Resources, Wilmington (2003): 205–228.
"The emancipation of America." American Historical Review 105.1 (2000): 131–152.
"The struggle: the first centralist-federalist conflict in Mexico." the Americas 49.1 (1992): 1-22.
"The origins of the 1832 rebellion." Patterns of contention in Mexican history, Wilmington, SR Books (1992): 145–162.
"La Constitución de 1824 y la formación del Estado mexicano." Historia mexicana 40.3 (1991): 507–535.
"Two Revolutions: France 1789 and Mexico 1810." The Americas (1990): 161–176.
"From Royal Subject to Republican Citizen: The Role of the Autonomists in the Independence of Mexico." Rodríguez O.(coord.) (1989): 19–43.
"The Conflict between Church and State in Early Republican Mexico." New World 2 (1987): 93-112.

Translated from Spanish Wikipedia

References

Living people
University of Texas at Austin alumni
University of Houston alumni
California State University, Long Beach faculty
University of California, Irvine faculty
Historians of Latin America
Historians of Mexico
Latin Americanists
Academic journal editors
1940 births
Ecuadorian emigrants to the United States